Sir William Ernest Reynolds-Stephens  (Detroit 8 August 1862 – Tunbridge Wells 23 February 1943) was an eminent American-born British artist and sculptor.

He was educated at Blackheath School of Art  and the  Royal Academy School. He exhibited there from 1886 until 1942. His work can also be seen at St Paul's Cathedral, Lambeth Palace and Southwell Minster.

For 11 years he was president of the Royal Society of British Sculptors. 
 
He was cremated at Golders Green Crematorium.

Notes

1862 births
1943 deaths
Artists from Detroit
English sculptors
English male sculptors
19th-century English painters
English male painters
American emigrants to England
20th-century English painters
Knights Bachelor
20th-century British sculptors
19th-century British sculptors
20th-century English male artists
19th-century English male artists